The 1982 French Open was a tennis tournament that took place on the outdoor clay courts at the Stade Roland Garros in Paris, France. The tournament ran from 24 May until 6 June. It was the 86th staging of the French Open, and the first Grand Slam tennis event of 1982.

Finals

Men's singles

 Mats Wilander defeated  Guillermo Vilas, 1–6, 7–6(8–6), 6–0, 6–4
It was Wilander's 1st career title (and his 1st ATP title overall).

Women's singles

 Martina Navratilova defeated  Andrea Jaeger, 7–6(8-6), 6–1 
It was Navratilova's 8th title of the year, and her 63rd overall. It was her 4th career Grand Slam title, and her 1st French Open title.

Men's doubles

 Sherwood Stewart /  Ferdi Taygan defeated  Hans Gildemeister /  Belus Prajoux, 7–5, 6–3, 1–1, retired

Women's doubles

 Martina Navratilova /  Anne Smith defeated  Rosemary Casals /  Wendy Turnbull, 6–3, 6–4

Mixed doubles

 Wendy Turnbull /  John Lloyd defeated  Cláudia Monteiro /  Cássio Motta, 6–2, 7–6

Prize money

Total prize money for the event was FF4,708,120.

References

External links
 French Open official website

 
1982 in French tennis
Clay court tennis tournaments
1982 Grand Prix (tennis)
1982 in Paris